About  in front of the occipital pole of the human brain, on the infero-lateral border is an indentation or notch, named the preoccipital notch. It is considered a landmark because the occipital lobe is located just behind the line that connects that notch with the parietoccipital sulcus.

Gallery

References 

Cerebrum
Sulci (neuroanatomy)